St. Katharina (St. Catherine's Church) in Nuremberg, Bavaria, was an important medieval church, destroyed during the Second World War and preserved as a ruin.

History 

St. Catherine's was the church of a former Dominican convent, in the Diocese of Bamberg, famous for its medieval library. It was founded in 1295 by Konrad von Neumarkt and his wife Adelheid, patricians of the Pfinzig family. In the Middle Ages it had an important medieval library. After the Reformation, it became a Lutheran church. The convent was closed in 1596 after the last inhabitant died.

The church was associated with the Meistersingers who met there from 1620 to 1778, and is featured in the opening scene of Richard Wagner's opera Die Meistersinger von Nürnberg.

Although destroyed by air raids in 1945, it was partially restored (1970–71) and is used for events such as open-air concerts.

References

Bibliography

External links 

 Dokumentierende Rekonstruktion der Bibliothek des Nürnberger Katharinenklosters

Lutheran churches in Nuremberg
Nuremberg Katharine
Nuremberg Katharine
Nuremberg Katharine